Genoplesium nigricans, commonly known as mallee midge orchid, is a species of orchid endemic to Australia. It is a terrestrial herb with a single leaf mostly surrounding the stem, and up to 50 tiny, greenish flowers with a deep maroon-coloured labellum and often have a fruity fragrance. Australian authorities use the name Corunastylis tepperi, a widespread species which has been confused with Corunastylis nigricans, a species with purplish brown flowers and which only occurs on Kangaroo Island and the Eyre Peninsula.

Description
Genoplesium nigricans is a terrestrial, perennial, deciduous, sympodial herb. A single long leaf surrounds the stem from the base of the plant to the lowest of the flowers.

The inflorescence is a spike with from 5 to 50 crowded, tiny, non-resupinate flowers which are bright green with a dark maroon-coloured to purplish-black labellum. The dark-coloured labellum is egg-shaped, about the same size as the petals with a minutely wavy edge. The callus is narrow egg-shaped and extends almost to the tip of the labellum. The column, which is below the labellum has wings with a rough surface. Flowering occurs between February and May and the fruit that follows is a non-fleshy, dehiscent capsule containing hundreds of seeds.

Taxonomy and naming
In 1880, Otto Temper, a South Australian school teacher, reported to the Royal Society of South Australia, the discovery he had made of an orchid "in respect of which Baron F. v. Mueller, has done me the honour of naming it Prasophyllum Tepperi". Tepper's description was formalised by Ferdinand von Mueller in 1882 with the name published in Systematic Census of Australian Plants.

In 2002, David Jones and Mark Clements changed the name of Prasophyllum tepperi to Corunastylis tepperi. The World Checklist of Selected Plant Families lists C. tepperi as a synonym of Genoplesium nigricans. The specific epithet (tepperi) honours Otto Tepper and the epithet nigricans is a Latin word meaning "blackish".

Corunastylis nigricans, a different species, sometimes confused with Genoplesium nigricans or Corunastylis tepperi, has purplish brown flowers with green markings and a shiny, dark purplish labellum and only occurs in parts of South Australia.

Distribution and habitat
The mallee midge orchid occurs in arid areas of north-western Victoria, mostly in mallee shrubland and Callitris woodland, and in the Avon Wheatbelt, Coolgardie, Esperance Plains, Hampton and Mallee biogeographic regions of southern Western Australia. There are also isolated populations in South Australia. It is a very drought and heat tolerant species which is dormant when the soil is hard-packed and dry, growing and flowering in the cooler, wetter autumn months.

Ecology
This species appears to be pollinated by tiny fruit flies which are attracted by the scent of the flower at the same time as other plants, such as Leucopogon are flowering.

References

External links
 
 

nigricans
Orchids of Australia
Flora of Western Australia
Plants described in 1880